Trifurcula iberica is a moth of the family Nepticulidae. 

The wingspan is 6-7.2 mm for males.

External links
Nepticulidae and Opostegidae of the world

Nepticulidae
Moths of Europe
Moths described in 1990